The women's super-G competition of the Beijing 2022 Olympics was held on 11 February 2022 on the "Rock" course at Yanqing National Alpine Ski Centre ski resort in Yanqing District. Lara Gut-Behrami of Switzerland won her first gold medal, confirming her status as a defending world champion. Mirjam Puchner of Austria became the silver medalist, winning her first Olympic medal, and Michelle Gisin of Switzerland won bronze.

Ester Ledecká was the defending champion. The silver medalist, Anna Veith, and the bronze medalist, Tina Weirather, both retired from competitions. At the 2021–22 FIS Alpine Ski World Cup, five super-G events were held before the Olympics. Federica Brignone was leading the ranking, followed by Elena Curtoni and Sofia Goggia. Gut-Behrami was the 2021 world champion, with Corinne Suter and Mikaela Shiffrin being the silver and bronze medalists, respectively.

Qualification

Results
The race was started at 11:00 local time, (UTC+8).

References

Women's alpine skiing at the 2022 Winter Olympics